Mohammad Hassan Rajabzadeh (born June 10, 1983) is an Iranian footballer.

Club career

Club career statistics

Honours
 2nd Hazfi Cup 2004–05 with Aboomoslem
 Promoted to Persian Gulf League Azadegan League 2007–08 with Payam
 Persian Gulf Cup 2010–11 with Sepahan
 Persian Gulf Cup 2011–12 with Sepahan
 Azadegan League 2013–14 with Padideh
 Promoted to Persian Gulf League Azadegan League 2013–14 with Padideh
 Azadegan League 2015–16 with Paykan
 Promoted to Persian Gulf League Azadegan League 2015–16 with Paykan

Coaching Honours
2nd Azadegan League 2020–21 with Havadar
 Promoted to Persian Gulf League Azadegan League 2020–21 with Havadar

References

1983 births
Living people
F.C. Aboomoslem players
Sepahan S.C. footballers
Payam Mashhad players
Malavan players
Rah Ahan players
Shahr Khodro F.C. players
Paykan F.C. players
Iranian footballers
Association football midfielders